The Textiles and Garment functional constituency is a functional constituency in the elections for the Legislative Council of Hong Kong, first created in 1995 as one of the nine new functional constituencies under the electoral reform, carried out by the then Governor Chris Patten in which the electorate consisted of total 60,568 eligible voters related to the textile and garment industry. It was abolished with the colonial Legislative Council and dissolved after the transfer of the sovereignty in 1997.

The constituency was recreated for the 1998 Legislative Council election unless its electorate base has been narrowed which is composed of textiles and garment associations and traders only. After a major electoral overhaul in 2021, the registered voters are restricted from 1,607 in 2016 to 348 corporate voters of the designated associations.

Composition
The Textiles and Garment functional constituency is composed of—
 corporate members of the Textile Council of Hong Kong Limited entitled to vote at general meetings of the Council; and
 corporate members of each of the following bodies entitled to vote at general meetings of the body—
 The Federation of Hong Kong Cotton Weavers;
 The Federation of Hong Kong Garment Manufacturers;
 Hong Kong Chinese Textile Mills Association;
 The Hongkong Cotton Spinners Association;
 Hong Kong Garment Manufacturers Association Ltd.;
 Hongkong Knitwear Exporters & Manufacturers Association Limited; (Amended 11 of 2019 s. 5)
 Hong Kong Woollen & Synthetic Knitting Manufacturers’ Association Ltd.;
 The Hong Kong Association of Textile Bleachers, Dyers, Printers and Finishers Limited;
 The Hong Kong Weaving Mills Association;
 The Hong Kong General Chamber of Textiles Limited.

Return members

Electoral results

2020s

2010s

2000s

1990s

References

Constituencies of Hong Kong
Constituencies of Hong Kong Legislative Council
Functional constituencies (Hong Kong)
1995 establishments in Hong Kong
Constituencies established in 1995